Richard Lewis Nettleship (17 December 1846 – 25 August 1892) was an English philosopher.

Life
The youngest brother of Henry Nettleship, he was educated at Uppingham and Balliol College, Oxford, where he held a scholarship. He won the Hertford scholarship, the Ireland, the Gaisford Prize for Greek verse, a Craven scholarship and the Arnold prize, but took only a second class in literae humaniores.

Nettleship became fellow and tutor of his college and succeeded to the work of T. H. Green, whose writings he edited with a memoir. He was fond of music and outdoor sports, and rowed in his college boat. He died on 25 August 1892, from the effects of exposure on Mont Blanc, and was buried at Chamonix.

Works
Nettleship left an unfinished work on Plato, part of which was published after his death, together with his lectures on logic and some essays. His long essay The Theory of Education in the Republic of Plato was published in Hellenica.

His thought was idealistic, embodying elements of Hegelianism but also, in its account of the Platonic Forms (eide, idiai), markedly influenced by a particular reading of the Kantian categories. Many saw him as a model and example of philosophical honest and persistent philosophical inquiry. This did not prevent the undergraduates of Balliol from a gentle parody in the 1880 Masque of Balliol:

Roughly, so to say, you know,
I am N-TTL-SH-P or so;
You are gated after Hall,
That's all. I mean that's nearly all.

The inchoateness of Nettleship's philosophical thinking is more apparent in the Philosophical Remains than in the separate volume of lectures on Plato's Republic. From that volume a definite view of the aims, limits and scope of Plato's text emerges clearly. Few historians of philosophy would now accept, however, Nettleship's view of the analogy of the Line (509e-511c, 534a) 
as involving throughout a temporal progression.

Selected bibliography
An extensive bibliography of works by and about R.L. Nettleship has been produced by Prof. Colin Tyler (Centre for Idealism and the New Liberalism at the University of Hull, UK). It can be downloaded at: https://idealismandnewliberalism.org/bibliographies/

[A] 

[B]

See also

 British idealism

References

 

1846 births
1892 deaths
19th-century English non-fiction writers
19th-century English philosophers
19th-century essayists
19th-century philosophers
Deaths from hypothermia
English essayists
English logicians
English male non-fiction writers
Idealists
Kant scholars
Lecturers
People educated at Uppingham School
Philosophers of history
Philosophers of logic
Philosophy academics
Philosophy writers
Platonists